Sredny Karachan is a rural locality (a selo) in Verkhnekarachanskoye Rural Settlement, Gribanovsky  District, Voronezh Oblast, Russia. The population was 1,091 as of 2010. There are 12 streets.

Geography 
Sredny Karachan is located on the Karachan River, 18 km southwest of Gribanovsky (the district's administrative centre) by road. Verkhny Karachan is the nearest rural locality.

References 

Rural localities in Gribanovsky District
Russia
Gribanovsky District